Race Against the Tide is a Canadian television reality series, which premiered September 9, 2021 on CBC Television. Hosted by Shaun Majumder in season 1 and Maestro Fresh Wes in season 2, the series features ten teams of artists competing to produce sand sculptures in the Bay of Fundy before the tide rises to destroy their creations. The sculptors are evaluated by two judges including Karen Fralich.

Episodes

References

2021 Canadian television series debuts
2020s Canadian reality television series
CBC Television original programming
Television shows filmed in New Brunswick